Lansky (masculine), Lanskaya (feminine), or Lanskoye (neuter) may refer to:
Lansky (surname)
Lansky (1999 film), about Meyer Lansky
Lansky (2021 film), about Meyer Lansky
Lansky Brothers, a clothing store in Memphis, United States
Lanskaya railway station, a railway station in St. Petersburg, Russia
Lanskaya electric substation, an electric substation of Lanskaya railway station
Lanskoye, a rural locality (a village) in Tula Oblast, Russia

See also
Lansky score, a performance status scale for children with cancer
Lensky (disambiguation)